David Hodgins (1850–1930), was a former Republican member of the Wisconsin State Assembly.

Hodgins was born on December 30, 1850. He was educated in Canada and came to Hortonville, Wisconsin in 1865. He worked as a farmer, and served four terms as supervisor of Hortonville.

He was elected to the Wisconsin State Assembly in 1900, and served multiple terms.

He died on May 6, 1930, and is buried in Union Cemetery, in Hortonville.

References

1850 births
1930 deaths
People from Hortonville, Wisconsin
Farmers from Wisconsin
Burials in Wisconsin
Republican Party members of the Wisconsin State Assembly